Clean and Unclean may refer to:
 Clean and unclean animals, religious views on clean and unclean animals
 Tumah and taharah, ritual "purity" and "impurity" under Jewish law